In December 2019, the International Union for Conservation of Nature (IUCN) listed 460 endangered avian species. Of all evaluated avian species, 4% are listed as endangered. 
No subpopulations of birds have been evaluated by the IUCN.

For a species to be considered endangered by the IUCN it must meet certain quantitative criteria which are designed to classify taxa facing "a very high risk of extinction". An even higher risk is faced by critically endangered species, which meet the quantitative criteria for endangered species. Critically endangered birds are listed separately. There are 683 avian species which are endangered or critically endangered. 

Additionally 53 avian species (0.48% of those evaluated) are listed as data deficient, meaning there is insufficient information for a full assessment of conservation status. As these species typically have small distributions and/or populations, they are intrinsically likely to be threatened, according to the IUCN. While the category of data deficient indicates that no assessment of extinction risk has been made for the taxa, the IUCN notes that it may be appropriate to give them "the same degree of attention as threatened taxa, at least until their status can be assessed".

This is a complete list of endangered avian species evaluated by the IUCN. Where possible, common names for taxa are given while links point to the scientific name used by the IUCN.

Penguins

Procellariiformes

Gruiformes

Parrots
There are 41 parrot species assessed as endangered.

Kakapo species
New Zealand kaka
Kea

Cockatoos

Psittacids

Ciconiiformes

Suliformes

Pigeons and doves

Pelecaniformes

Galliformes

Bucerotiformes

Accipitriformes

Secretarybirds
Secretarybird

Accipitridae

Anseriformes

Owls

Charadriiformes

Passerines

Pittas

Cotingas

Tyrant flycatchers

Antbirds

Tapaculos

Ovenbirds

Bushshrikes and allies

Vangas

Monarchs

Crows, jays, magpies, and allies

Larks

Cisticolas

Marsh-warblers

White-eyes

Laughingthrushes

Old World flycatchers

Weavers

Finches and Hawaiian honeycreepers

True sparrows

Grackles, New World blackbirds, and New World orioles

New World warblers

True tanagers

Other Passeriformes

Caprimulgiformes
There are 23 species in the order Caprimulgiformes assessed as endangered.

Hummingbirds

Nightjars

Swifts
Mariana swiftlet

Piciformes

Yellow-browed toucanet
Red-headed flameback
Yellow-faced flameback
Lesser crescent-chested puffbird
White-rumped woodpecker
Speckle-chested piculet
Varzea piculet
Red-necked aracari

Other bird species

See also 
 Lists of IUCN Red List endangered species
 List of least concern birds
 List of near threatened birds
 List of vulnerable birds
 List of critically endangered birds
 List of extinct bird species since 1500
 List of data deficient birds

References 

Birds
Endangered birds
Endangered birds
Bird conservation